Alexander Shaw may refer to:

 Alexander Shaw (surgeon) (1804–1890), Scottish surgeon
 Alexander Shaw (Canadian politician) (1833–1911), Canadian lawyer and politician
 Alexander Croft Shaw (1846–1902), Canadian Anglican missionary to Japan
 Alexander Preston Shaw (1879–1966), African-American clergyman
 Alexander William Shaw (1847–1923), Irish bacon manufacturer and golf enthusiast
 Alexander Shaw, 2nd Baron Craigmyle (1883–1944), MP for Kilmarnock, 1915–1923
 Alexander Shaw (cricketer) (1907–1945), English cricketer
 Alexander Shaw (British Army officer) (1737–1811), soldier and Lieutenant Governor of the Isle of Man
 Alex Shaw (rugby union) (born 1987), rugby player
 Alex Shaw (basketball) (1907–2009), college men's basketball coach
 Alex Shaw (soccer), Canadian soccer player